Millu Hirka (Quechua millu salty, Ancash Quechua hirka mountain, Hispanicized spelling Millujirca) is a mountain in the Cordillera Blanca in the Andes of Peru, about  high. It is situated in the Ancash Region, Huari Province, Huari District. Millu Hirka lies northeast of Antap'iti and southeast of Tullparahu. Milluqucha ("salty lake", Millucocha) is the name of the lake north of the mountain.

References

Mountains of Peru
Mountains of Ancash Region